Matthew Gandy, FBA (born 1965 in London) is a geographer and urbanist.  He is Professor of Cultural and Historical Geography and Fellow of King's College at the University of Cambridge, moving from University College London (UCL) in 2015, where he was also the founder and first Director of the UCL Urban Laboratory from 2005 to 2011.

Education
Matthew Gandy grew up in Islington, London. 
 University of Cambridge, BA Geography, 1988 
 London School of Economics, PhD Geography, 1992

Career
His research on environmental history, urban infrastructure and visual culture has involved work in a variety of countries including France, Germany, Nigeria, India, the UK and the USA.   In 2003 he was winner of the Spiro Kostof Prize of the Society of Architectural Historians for Concrete and clay: reworking nature in New York City as the book “within the last two years that has made the greatest contribution to our understanding of urbanism and its relationship with architecture”.  In 2005 he set up the UCL Urban Laboratory as an international and interdisciplinary centre for urban research and teaching  and in 2006 he was a founder of the London-wide Urban Salon.  In 2007 he produced and directed a documentary film, Liquid City (2007), which explores the complexity of water politics in Bombay/Mumbai. In 2015 his book "The fabric of space: water, modernity, and the urban imagination" won the Meridian Book Award for Outstanding Scholarly Work in Geography and in 2016 it was awarded the International Planning History Society's prize for the "most innovative book in planning history".  In 2016 he was elected as a Fellow of the British Academy.  In 2017 he produced, wrote, and directed the prize-winning documentary film, Natura Urbana: the Brachen of Berlin, which charts the dual histories of urban botany and geo-politics in post-war Berlin.

His current work explores three main themes: landscape (including depictions of nature in the visual arts), infrastructure and urban metabolism (including atmospheres and corporeal geographies), and urban bio-diversity.

He is also actively involved in local issues in Hackney, east London, writes regular reviews and commentaries for his blog Cosmopolis at http://www.matthewgandy.org, and is an urban field ecologist, specialising in entomology and has written a book on moths.

Publications
He has over a hundred publications  in many international journals including Architectural Design, International Journal of Urban and Regional Research, New Left Review and Society and Space. He is also author or editor of eleven books.

Selected publications include:
Books
 Gandy, M. 1994. Recycling and the politics of urban waste. London: Earthscan.
 
 
 
 
 
 
 Gandy, M, 2015. Nature, sexualité, et hétéropie.  Paris: Eterotopia.
 Gandy, M. 2016. Moth''. London: Reaktion Books.
 
 

Book chapters
 
 
 
 
 
 
 
 
 

Journal articles

See also
Human geography

References

External links

Living people
British geographers
Academics of University College London
Alumni of the University of Cambridge
Alumni of the London School of Economics
Fellows of the British Academy
Fellows of the Academy of Social Sciences
1965 births